The 2020 United States presidential election in Idaho was held on Tuesday, November 3, 2020, as part of the 2020 United States presidential election in which all 50 states plus the District of Columbia participated. Idaho voters chose electors to represent them in the Electoral College via a popular vote, pitting the Republican Party's nominee, incumbent President Donald Trump, and running mate Vice President Mike Pence against Democratic Party nominee, former Vice President Joe Biden, and his running mate California Senator Kamala Harris. Idaho has four electoral votes in the Electoral College.

Trump easily carried Idaho on Election Day, winning 63.9% of the vote to Biden’s 33.1%. Trump's percentage was higher than the 59.2% he received in 2016 due to the lack of third-party voters (namely Evan McMullin of neighboring Utah), but his margin of victory slightly declined, shrinking from 31.8% in 2016 to 30.8% in 2020. 

Prior to the election, all news organizations expected Trump to win the state handily. Idaho is one of the most staunchly Republican states in the nation, and has not backed a Democrat for President since 1964, when Lyndon B. Johnson very narrowly carried the state amidst a national landslide. 

Trump carried 41 of the state's 44 counties. Biden won Blaine County, home to Sun Valley and several other prime ski resorts; Latah County, home to the college town of Moscow; and Teton County, adjacent to Teton County, Wyoming. Although he did not carry the state's most populous county, Ada County, home to the rapidly growing state capital Boise, which no Democrat has carried since Franklin D. Roosevelt's 1936 landslide, Biden slightly improved on Barack Obama's 2008 result and lost Ada by less than four points. Biden's result of 46.4% and his margin of loss in the county were the highest and lowest for a Democratic presidential nominee since 1940, when Roosevelt won 49% of the county's vote, consequently losing by less than two points.

Per exit polls by the Associated Press, Trump's strength in Idaho came from white voters, especially those in rural areas, who comprised 91% of the electorate and backed Trump by 64%–32%. Trump also received strong support from Caucasian Protestants, who backed him with 71% of their vote.

Primary elections
The primary elections were on March 10, 2020.

Republican primary

Democratic primary

Bernie Sanders, Joe Biden, and Tulsi Gabbard were the major declared candidates.

General election

Predictions

Polling

Graphical summary

Aggregate polls

Polls

Electoral slates
These slates of electors were nominated by each party in order to vote in the Electoral College should their candidate win the state:

Results

By county

Counties that flipped from Republican to Democratic
 Teton (largest municipality: Victor)

By congressional district

Trump won both congressional districts.

See also
 United States presidential elections in Idaho
 Presidency of Joe Biden
 2020 Idaho elections
 2020 United States presidential election
 2020 Democratic Party presidential primaries
 2020 Republican Party presidential primaries
 2020 United States elections

Notes

References

Further reading

External links
 
 
  (State affiliate of the U.S. League of Women Voters)
 

Idaho
2020
Presidential